River Charlo is a community in Restigouche County, New Brunswick, Canada. It is part of the village of Charlo.  Named for an early resident, Charles, or "Charlo", Doucet.

Notable people

See also
List of neighbourhoods in New Brunswick

References

Neighbourhoods in New Brunswick